Pterophorus elaeopus is a moth of the family Pterophoridae, native to Asia.

It is found in India, China Vietnam, Thailand, Laos, Malaysia and Indonesia.

The wingspan is 18–21 mm.

References

elaeopus
Moths of Asia
Moths of Indonesia
Moths of Malaysia
Moths described in 1908